RAS guanyl releasing protein 4 is a protein in humans that is encoded by the RASGRP4 gene in chromosome 19.

The protein encoded by this gene is a member of the Ras guanyl nucleotide-releasing protein (RasGRP) family of Ras guanine nucleotide exchange factors. It contains a Ras exchange motif, a diacylglycerol-binding domain, and two calcium-binding EF hands. This protein was shown to activate H-Ras in a cation-dependent manner in vitro. Expression of this protein in myeloid cell lines was found to be correlated with elevated level of activated RAS protein, and the RAS activation can be greatly enhanced by phorbol ester treatment, which suggested a role of this protein in diacylglycerol regulated cell signaling pathways. Studies of a mast cell leukemia cell line expressing substantial amounts of abnormal transcripts of this gene indicated that this gene may play an important role in the final stages of mast cell development. Multiple transcript variants encoding different isoforms have been found for this gene. [provided by RefSeq, Apr 2009].

References

Further reading 

Genes on human chromosome 19